Sheykh ol Eslam may refer to:
 Sheykh ol Eslam, Hashtrud, East Azerbaijan Province
 Sheykh ol Eslam, Malekan, East Azerbaijan Province
 Sheykh ol Eslam, Kurdistan